James Huang may refer to:
 James Huang (actor) (born 1977), American actor
James C. F. Huang (born 1958), Taiwanese diplomat
C.-T. James Huang (born 1948), Taiwanese linguist